Last of the Elephant Men is a Canadian documentary film, which was released in 2015. Directed by Arnaud Bouquet and Daniel Ferguson, the film profiles the Bunong people of Cambodia, focusing in particular on their unique bond with the local population of elephants.

The film received three Canadian Screen Awards at the 4th Canadian Screen Awards in 2016, in the categories of Best Feature Length Documentary, Best Editing in a Documentary (Elric Robichon) and Best Cinematography in a Documentary (Arnaud Bouquet).

References

External links
 

2014 films
2014 documentary films
Canadian documentary films
Films about elephants
Documentary films about Cambodia
2010s English-language films
2010s Canadian films